The 2011–12 Japan Figure Skating Championships took place on 23–26 December 2011 at the Namihaya Dome in Kadoma, Osaka. It was the 80th edition of the event. Skaters competed in the disciplines of men's singles, ladies' singles, pair skating, and ice dancing on the senior level for the title of national champion of Japan.

Results

Men

Ladies

The ladies' free skating attracted television ratings of 26.7% in the Tokyo and Osaka regions, and 29.9% in Nagoya, peaking at 40.0% before Asada's score was announced.

Pairs

Ice dancing

Japan Junior Figure Skating Championships
The 2011–12 Junior Championships took place on 25–27 November 2011 at the Technol Ice Park Niida in Hachinohe, Aomori.

Men

Ladies

Ice dancing

References

External links
 2011–12 Japan Figure Skating Championships results
 2011–12 Japan Junior Figure Skating Championships results
 Japan Skating Federation

Japan Figure Skating Championships
Japan Championships
Figure Skating Championships